William Buchan may refer to:

William Buchan (physician) (1729–1805), Scottish physician
William Buchan, 3rd Baron Tweedsmuir (1916–2008), English peer and author
Bill Buchan Sr., Scottish-born American sailor and boat-builder
William Earl Buchan (born 1935), American sailor and Olympic champion
William Carl Buchan (born 1956), his son, American sailor and Olympic champion
Willie Buchan (1914–2003), Scottish footballer